The 2020 ADAC TCR Germany Touring Car Championship will be the fifth season of touring car racing to be run by the German-based sanctioning body ADAC to the TCR regulations. The series will run predominantly in ADAC's home nation Germany. As a support category to the ADAC GT Masters series, the championship will also take in races in the neighbouring nations of Austria and the Netherlands.

Max Hesse is the defending Drivers' champion, while Hyundai Team Engstler are the defending Teams' champions.

Teams and drivers 
Yokohama is the official tire supplier.

Calendar and results 
The initial calendar was released on 29 September 2019 with 7 rounds scheduled across Germany, Austria, the Netherlands and Czech Republic. Due to the COVID-19 pandemic on 16 March 2020 the pre-season test and the opening round, both scheduled to be held at the Motorsport Arena Oschersleben, were cancelled. The first revision of the calendar saw Autodrom Most in August as the season opener. On 24 May 2020 the final version of the calendar was published with the round at the Autodrom Most replaced by a round at the Lausitzring.

Drivers' Championship 

Scoring systems

Teams' Championship

Notes

References

External links 
 

2020 in German motorsport
Germany Touring Car Championship